Hearing
 Installation art
 Irma Hünerfauth
 NIME
 Performance art
 Planephones
 Radio art
 Site-specific art
 Site-specific theatre
 Sound architecture
 Sound poetry
 Sound recording
 Soundwalk
 Stereo
 Synesthesia
 Tape music
 Text-sound
 Transmission
 Waveform

Arts-related lists
Wikipedia indexes